Stockheim is a municipality in the district of Rhön-Grabfeld in Bavaria in Germany.  It is located in the Streu valley between Ostheim and Mellrichstadt.

References

Rhön-Grabfeld